His Majesty, Bunker Bean is a 1925 American silent comedy film directed by Harry Beaumont and starring Matt Moore. It is based on a 1916 play, His Majesty, Bunker Bean by Lee Wilson Dodd, taken from a novel Bunker Bean by Harry Leon Wilson. It was produced and distributed by Warner Bros.

Plot
As described in a film magazine review, Bunker Bean, who is the stenographer of Jim Breede, a millionaire, is an imaginative youth who is told by a clairvoyant that he is the reincarnation of an Egyptian king. He tries to act the part of the king, and in so doing he fascinates his employer’s daughter Marie, who forces from him a promise to marry her. When Bunker learns that after all he is not the king’s reincarnation, he is so discouraged that he tells Marie he cannot marry her. His friend Bud Matthews encourages him, however, and all goes well until a fight starts on the day of the wedding. Bunker wins the fight. And he wins Marie’s father over by making him spend a large sum of money to secure some stock.

Cast

Box office
According to Warner Bros. records, the film earned $105,000 domestically and $25,000 in foreign markets.

Preservation status
An abridged or incomplete print survives.

References

External links

1925 films
American silent feature films
Films directed by Harry Beaumont
Warner Bros. films
American films based on plays
Films based on American novels
American black-and-white films
Silent American comedy films
1925 comedy films
1920s American films